The Ministry of Department of Animal Husbandry is a department of Government of Maharashtra to look after animal husbandry in Maharashtra.

Department is headed by the cabinet level minister. Minister of State assists cabinet minister. Radhakrishna Vikhe Patil is current Minister for Husbandry.

Head office

List of Cabinet Ministers

List of Ministers of State

List of Principal Secretary

Animal husbandry in Maharashtra
Many farmers in Maharashtra depend on animal husbandry for their livelihood. In addition to supplying milk, meat, eggs, wool, their castings (dung) and hides, animals, mainly bullocks, are the major source of power for both farmers and drayers. Thus, animal husbandry plays an important role in the rural economy. The national gross value of output from this sector was 8,123 billion Rupees in FY 2015–16.

Organizational structure
Department is further divided into following sub-departments for ease of administration. 
 Maharashtra Veterinary State Council, Nagpur
 Maharashtra Livestock Development Board Akola
 Sheep & Goat Development Corporation, Pune

Maharashtra Animal and Fishery Sciences University
Maharashtra Animal and Fishery Sciences University is an agriculture state university headquartered from Nagpur, Maharashtra, India. It was established under The Maharashtra Animal and Fishery Sciences University Act, 1998. It was officially established on 3 December 2000 by carving seven colleges out of the other four state agriculture universities in Maharashtra.

See All Ministry 
Ministry of General Administration (Maharashtra)
Ministry of Information and Public Relations (Maharashtra)
Ministry of Information Technology (Maharashtra)
Ministry of Law and Judiciary (Maharashtra)
Ministry of Home Affairs (Maharashtra)
Ministry of Public Works (Excluding Public Undertakings) (Maharashtra)
Ministry of Public Works (Including Public Undertakings) (Maharashtra)
Ministry of Finance (Maharashtra)
Ministry of Planning (Maharashtra)
Ministry of Revenue (Maharashtra)
Ministry of State Excise (Maharashtra)
Ministry of Special Assistance (Maharashtra)
Ministry of Social Justice (Maharashtra)
Ministry of Forests Department (Maharashtra)
Ministry of Environment and Climate Change (Maharashtra)
Ministry of Energy (Maharashtra)
Ministry of Water Resources (Maharashtra)
Ministry of Command Area Development (Maharashtra)
Ministry of Public Health (Maharashtra)
Ministry of Housing (Maharashtra)
Ministry of Urban Development (Maharashtra)
Ministry of Rural Development (Maharashtra)
Ministry of Labour (Maharashtra)
Ministry of Co-operation (Maharashtra)
Ministry of Marketing (Maharashtra)
Ministry of Transport (Maharashtra)
Ministry of Industries (Maharashtra)
Ministry of Mining Department (Maharashtra)
Ministry of Textiles (Maharashtra)
Ministry of Protocol (Maharashtra)
Ministry of Tourism (Maharashtra)
Ministry of Cultural Affairs (Maharashtra)
Ministry of Marathi Language (Maharashtra)
Ministry of Water Supply (Maharashtra)
Ministry of Soil and Water Conservation (Maharashtra)
Ministry of Parliamentary Affairs (Maharashtra)
Ministry of Sanitation (Maharashtra)
Ministry of Woman and Child Development (Maharashtra)
Ministry of School Education (Maharashtra)
Ministry of Medical Education (Maharashtra)
Ministry of Higher and Technical Education (Maharashtra)
Ministry of Skill Development and Entrepreneurship (Maharashtra)
Ministry of Sports and Youth Welfare (Maharashtra)
Ministry of Ex. Servicemen Welfare (Maharashtra)
Ministry of Agriculture (Maharashtra)
Ministry of Food, Civil Supplies and Consumer Protection (Maharashtra)
Ministry of Food and Drug Administration (Maharashtra)
Ministry of Animal Husbandry Department (Maharashtra)
Ministry of Dairy Development (Maharashtra)
Ministry of Horticulture (Maharashtra)
Ministry of Fisheries Department (Maharashtra)
Ministry of Ports Development (Maharashtra)
Ministry of Disaster Management (Maharashtra)
Ministry of Relief & Rehabilitation (Maharashtra)
Ministry of Khar Land Development (Maharashtra)
Ministry of Earthquake Rehabilitation (Maharashtra)
Ministry of Employment Guarantee (Maharashtra)
Ministry of Minority Development and Aukaf (Maharashtra)
Ministry of Majority Welfare Development (Maharashtra)
Ministry of Tribal Development (Maharashtra)
Ministry of Vimukta Jati (Maharashtra)
Ministry of Nomadic Tribes (Maharashtra)
Ministry of Other Backward Classes (Maharashtra)
Ministry of Other Backward Bahujan Welfare (Maharashtra)
Ministry of Special Backward Classes Welfare (Maharashtra)
Ministry of Socially and Educationally Backward Classes (Maharashtra)

References

External links

Government ministries of Maharashtra
Maharashtra
Animal husbandry in India